Jamshid Mashayekhi (November 26, 1934 – April 2, 2019) was an Iranian actor. Mashayekhi, Ali Nasirian, Ezatollah Entezami, Mohammad Ali Keshavarz and Davoud Rashidi are known as "the five most important actors in the history of Iranian cinema" because of their influence.

Career
Mashayekhi began professional acting on stage in 1957. His first feature film role was Brick and Mirror (1965, Ebrahim Golestan). After a four-year break, he acted in The Cow (1969, Darius Mehrjui) and Qeysar (1969, Masoud Kimiai). Mashayekhi commonly appeared as an elderly grandfather because of his white hair and charismatic face and figure. He received a best performance award for The Grandfather (1985, Majid Gharizadeh) from the First Festival of Non-aligned Countries in North Korea.

Selected filmography
Adobe and Mirror (1964)Kaiser (Qeysar, 1969)The Cow (Gaav, 1969)
 The Curse, 1973
 Prince Ehtedjab, 1974
 Brefts of Hope, 1977
 Hezar Dastan, (1978-1987, TV series)
 Kamalolmolk, 1983
 The Lead, 1988
 Honeymoon, 1992
 The Fateful Day, 1994
 Khane'i Rooy-e Āb (A House Built on Water), directed by Bahman Farmān'ārā, 2001
 Rising (Tolooa, 2001) directed by Hossein Shahabi Abadan, 2003
 Pol-e Sizdahom (The Thirteenth Bridge), directed by Farhad Gharib, 2005
 Yek Bus-e Kuchulu (A Teensy Kiss), directed by Bahman Farmān'ārā, 2005In Search of Peace'' directed by saeed soltani 2016-2017

References

External links

 Celebrating 50-year acting career of Jamshid Mashayekhi, BBC

1934 births
2019 deaths
People from Tehran
Male actors from Tehran
Iranian male film actors
Iranian male stage actors
Iranian male television actors
20th-century Iranian male actors
21st-century Iranian male actors
Crystal Simorgh for Best Actor winners
Recipients of the Order of Culture and Art
Iranian Science and Culture Hall of Fame recipients in Cinema